Korkut Eken (born 1945) is a former Turkish military officer and National Intelligence Organization (MİT) agent. He became involved in the Susurluk scandal in Turkey after some of his subordinates, notably Ayhan Çarkın, were convicted of extrajudicial killings. In 2001, among the first convictions arising from the scandal, Eken was found guilty of establishing and managing a criminal gang with the aim of "creating panic in society" and sentenced to six years in prison.

Career 
Eken joined the Turkish Military Academy in 1963. He took part in the Cyprus landings on 20 July 1974. He joined the Special Warfare Department in 1978. He received training in special warfare in Germany, the United Kingdom, and the United States. He gained fame in 1981 after he led a raid to rescue a plane seized by Islamic militants in Diyarbakır.

Eken was once involved in an ice producing business in Antalya with an MİT colleague called Mehmet Eymür; however this partnership ended after five years on acrimonious terms.

References

External links 
  

1945 births
People from Ankara
Turkish Military Academy alumni
Turkish Army officers
Susurluk scandal
Living people
Turkish military personnel of the Cyprus conflicts
Turkish invasion of Cyprus
1974 in Cyprus
Special Warfare Department personnel